Commodity traders are people or companies who speculate and trade in commodities as diverse as metals and spices.

Historical
Fuggers
Jacques Cœur
Tripp of Dordrecht 
Welsers

Individuals
 Marc Rich - oil
 John D. Arnold - natural gas
 Louis Bacon - cotton
 Jay Gould - gold

Modern companies
Archer Daniels Midland
Bunge Limited
Bdairy
Cargill
Castleton Commodities International
COFCO
Czarnikow
Glencore
Grand Anadolu İnternational Commodity Trading House
Gunvor
IXM
Koch Industries
Louis Dreyfus Group
Mercuria Energy Trading
Noble Group
Phibro
Serapis Global
Targray
Tempo Global Resources, LLC
Trafigura
Vitol

See also
 List of trading companies

References

 
Commodity traders
Commodity traders